John Francis Kidd (4 November 1947 – 26 February 2016) was an Australian Paralympic athletics and wheelchair basketball competitor.

He was born on 4 November 1947 in Maitland, New South Wales. He was a Corporal in the Australian Army from 22 April 1967 to 21 March 1968 and served in the Vietnam War. He was a probationary constable in the New South Wales Police Force from 1969 to 1982. He became a paraplegic when a truck knocked him off his police motorbike on Concord Road in Sydney in May 1969. Commissioner Norman Allan visited Kidd whilst he was in Prince Henry Hospital and told him he could remain in the police force as long as he wanted to. Kidd worked at several Sydney police stations before transferring to the Lismore Police Station's intelligence area where he assisted in major incidents such as the Murwillumbah bank robbery, the double beach murders at Kingscliff, a couple of other serious murders involving the Mr Asia syndicate. He retired from the police force in 1982 due to ill health. In March 1995, he was awarded the National Medal. He died in Toowoomba, Queensland on 26 February 2016.

At the 1976 Summer Games, he competed in three athletics events and won a silver medal in the Men's Javelin 4 and finished tenth in the Men's Shot Put 4 and fifteenth in the Men's Discus 4. He was also a member of the Australian wheelchair basketball team at the 1976 Toronto Games. Kidd broke Australian Javelin records from 1973 to 1977. He retired from competitive sport when he moved to Lismore, New South Wales.

In an interview in 1980, Kidd said "Before recovering from the accident my favorite sport was drinking beer. Because of the accident I discovered sport and it took me on several trips around the world... I can't complain".

References

External links
 John Kidd at Australian Athletics Historical Results
 

1947 births
2016 deaths
Paralympic athletes of Australia
Athletes (track and field) at the 1976 Summer Paralympics
Paralympic silver medalists for Australia
Wheelchair basketball players at the 1976 Summer Paralympics
Australian men's wheelchair basketball players
Australian police officers
Medalists at the 1976 Summer Paralympics
Paralympic medalists in athletics (track and field)
People from Maitland, New South Wales
Basketball players from New South Wales
Australian male javelin throwers
Australian male shot putters
Australian male discus throwers
Wheelchair javelin throwers
Wheelchair shot putters
Wheelchair discus throwers
Paralympic javelin throwers
Paralympic shot putters
Paralympic discus throwers